Nafi' ibn Hilal al-Jamali was originally from Yemen and one of the braves and nobles of Arabs. He was one of the companions of Ali ibn Abi Talib and helped Husayn ibn Ali in battle of Karbala and finally was killed in that battle.

Background

He was one of the companions of Ali ibn Abi Talib. He had been with Ali ibn Abi Talib in all of his battles: Siffin, Nahrawan, and Jamal. Before Muslim ibn Aqil was killed in Kufa, joined to Husayn's caravan and came with him to Karbala.

In Karbala
In battle of Karbala Nafi' had written his name on the arrows by poison and shot them and recited: "I shoot it, and its tips trained, In poison, on the wind borne, To fill the earth with shots, and the soul, Is not benefited by fear at all.

Twelve men of enemy were killed by Nafi' ibn Hilal then his arms were injured by stones that were shot by enemies and he was taken as a captive. Shimr and his soldiers carried him to Umar ibn Sa'd. After a conversation between them Ibn Sa'd ordered to Shimr to kill him and Shimr cut off his head.

See also 
 List of casualties in Husayn's army at the Battle of Karbala
 Burayr ibn Khudayr al-Hamdani

References 

People killed at the Battle of Karbala
Husayn ibn Ali
Hussainiya